Andrew Philip Iosue (born November 7, 1927) is a retired United States Air Force four-star general who served as Commander, Air Training Command (COMATC) from 1983 to 1986.

Biography

Early years
Iosue was born in 1927 in Somerville, Massachusetts. He graduated from Everett High School (Everett, Massachusetts) in 1945 and then attended the University of Massachusetts Amherst where he received a Bachelor of Science Degree in Bacteriology in 1951; and a master's degree from Cornell University. He holds honorary doctoral degrees from the University of Massachusetts, University of Rochester and Embry–Riddle Aeronautical Aeronautical University. He entered active duty in July 1951 as a medical service officer with primary duty as a Bacteriologist at Westover Air Force Base, Massachusetts. Iosue next entered flight training. He received his pilot wings in March 1954 at Reese Air Force Base, Texas, and completed training at Mather Air Force Base, California, in September 1954. He then was assigned to the 36th Rescue Flight Air Rescue Squadron at Johnson Air Base, Japan.

From July 1957 to August 1960, he was an Air Force Reserve Officer Training Corps instructor at Cornell University. He subsequently returned to operational duties with the 354th Tactical Fighter Wing at Myrtle Beach Air Force Base, South Carolina. In June 1963 Iosue received his initial assignment in tactical airlift, when he joined the 317th Troop Carrier Wing at Évreux Air Base, France, flying C-130 Hercules. He moved with the wing in 1964 to Lockbourne Air Force Base, Ohio, where he remained until July 1966 as a C-130 instructor pilot and chief of wing training. Iosue then spent four years as chief of the Rated Officer Assignments Section for the Air Force Military Personnel Center at Randolph Air Force Base.

Vietnam
In July 1970 he went to the Republic of Vietnam (South Vietnam) and commanded the 504th Tactical Air Support Group at Cam Ranh Bay Air Base. The unit was responsible for the forward air controllers in Southeast Asia. In May 1971 he went to the Republic of China (Taiwan) and became commander of the 374th Tactical Airlift Wing at Ching Chuan Kang Air Base, Taiwan. Highlights of this assignment included developing and implementing a C-130 low-level drop system in support of operations at An Lộc, Republic of Vietnam, in May 1972; flying more than 200 combat missions while in Southeast Asia; and in January 1973, in support of the release of American prisoners of war, flying the first U.S. Air Force aircraft to land at Gia Lam Airbase in Hanoi, in 19 years.

Later career
From June 1973 to July 1975, Iosue was assigned as deputy director of personnel programs, Office of the Deputy Chief of Staff, Personnel, Headquarters U.S. Air Force, Washington, D.C. He later became director. He was then named commander of the U.S. Air Force Recruiting Service and deputy chief of staff, recruiting for Air Training Command at Randolph Air Force Base.

Iosue took command of the Air Force Military Training Center, Lackland Air Force Base, Texas, in September 1976. In March 1979, his assigned driver chased Ed Roney, an airman who was in basic training at the time after Roney failed to salute the general's staff car as it passed. Roney made his way back to his BMTS. When Roney graduated from BMTS a couple of weeks later, he sent the general two Domino's pizzas. In April 1979 he returned to Air Force headquarters as deputy chief of staff for manpower and personnel. He took command of Air Training command in 1983, and retired from the Air Force on September 1, 1986. Iosue, a widower, married Shirley Case, an Air force widow, in October 2011.

Since his retirement from the Air Force in 1986, General Iosue has resided in San Antonio, Texas. He has served as a Director of Kelly Field National Bank and Director of Government Personnel Mutual Life Insurance Company. He has served as President of the San Antonio Golf Association and Vice President of the Rotary Club of San Antonio. He has served on the Executive Boards of Alamo Area Boy Scouts. The United Way, World Affairs Council and C.A.M.P. (Children 's Association for Maximum Potential). He has also been on the Development Board of the University of Massachusetts and Incarnate Word University and past President of Ratama Race Track.

For the past 20 years, General Iosue has spent a good portion of his summers at his summer home in Crosslake, Minnesota.

Awards
Iosue was a command pilot with more than 6,500 flying hours and earned the Parachutist Badge. His military decorations and awards include the Air Force Distinguished Service Medal, Legion of Merit with two oak leaf clusters, Distinguished Flying Cross with oak leaf cluster, Air Medal with three oak leaf clusters, Air Force Commendation Medal, Presidential Unit Citation Emblem with oak leaf cluster, Air Force Outstanding Unit Award Ribbon with oak leaf cluster and Republic of Vietnam Gallantry Cross with palm.

Iosue received an honorary doctor of aeronautics degree from Embry–Riddle Aeronautical University in Prescott, Arizona, in December 1983 and an honorary doctor of laws degree from the University of Akron in May 1985.

References

External links

1927 births
Living people
United States Air Force generals
Recipients of the Legion of Merit
Recipients of the Distinguished Flying Cross (United States)
United States Air Force personnel of the Vietnam War
People from Somerville, Massachusetts
University of Massachusetts Amherst College of Natural Sciences alumni
University of Massachusetts Amherst alumni
Recipients of the Air Medal
Recipients of the Air Force Distinguished Service Medal
Recipients of the Order of the Sword (United States)
Cornell University alumni
American expatriates in Taiwan
Military personnel from Massachusetts